Leptospermum roei is a species of spreading shrub that is endemic to the southwest of Western Australia. It has thin, fibrous bark, long egg-shaped to narrow wedge-shaped leaves, white or pink flowers and small fruit that are shed with the seeds.

Description
Leptospermum roei is a spreading shrub with thin, fibrous bark and erect branches, the younger stems with silky hairs, at least at first. The flower buds have a few pale reddish brown bracts and bracteoles at the base but that fall off well before the flower opens.

Taxonomy and naming
Leptospermum roei was first formally described in 1867 by George Bentham in Flora Australiensis.

Distribution and habitat
This teatree grows on sand, on gravel or on granite outcrops in the Avon Wheatbelt, Coolgardie and Mallee biogeographic regions.

Conservation status
This leptospermum is listed as "not threatened" by the Western Australian Government Department of Parks and Wildlife.

References

roei
Flora of Western Australia
Plants described in 1867
Taxa named by George Bentham